Rory Linkletter (born 12 August 1996) is a Canadian long-distance runner. In 2022, Linkletter set a personal best time of 2:10:24 in 2022 World Athletics Championships – Men's marathon to place 20th in Eugene and Springfield, Oregon. In 2019, he competed in the senior men's race at the 2019 IAAF World Cross Country Championships held in Aarhus, Denmark. He finished in 82nd place.

In 2017, he competed in the senior men's race at the 2017 IAAF World Cross Country Championships held in Kampala, Uganda. He finished in 76th place.

In 2019, he finished in 5th place in the senior 10,000 metres event at the 2019 NACAC Cross Country Championships held in Port of Spain, Trinidad and Tobago. In the same year, he also finished in 6th place in the men's 10,000 metres event at the 2019 Pan American Games held in Lima, Peru.

References

External links 
 
 Running Rivals podcast
 Rory Linkletter BYU Cougars track profile
 Rory Linkletter BYU Cougars cross country profile
 Rory Linkletter BYU Cougars cross country and track results

Living people
1996 births
Canadian male long-distance runners
Canadian male cross country runners
Athletes (track and field) at the 2019 Pan American Games
Pan American Games track and field athletes for Canada
BYU Cougars men's track and field athletes
Brigham Young University alumni